Eduard Ludwig Alexander (14 March 1881 – 1 March 1945, also known as Eduard Louis Alexander and Eduard Ludwig) was a German politician of the Communist Party (KPD) and a representative in the Reichstag.

Career

Eduard Ludwig Alexander was born in Essen; his father was an office manager. He attended the Royal Gymnasium at Burgplatz zu Essen, where he received his Abitur in 1900. He then studied at the Humboldt University of Berlin, at the Albert Ludwig University of Freiburg, and at the Université de Lausanne Jura, working from 1911 as a Rechtsanwalt and Justiziar in Berlin.

In 1917 Alexander was involved in the formation of the Spartacus League and joined the Communist Party of Germany (KPD) together with his wife upon the founding of the party in the Communist Party in 1918 and 1919. Between 1921 and 1925, he was a city councillor in Berlin while simultaneously serving, under the pseudonym Eduard Ludwig, as head of the press service of the KPD and financial editor of Die Rote Fahne.

At Pentecost in 1923, he and his wife Gertrud participated in the Marxist Work Week (Marxistische Arbeitswoche) and founded the Frankfurt Institute for Social Research. In 1927 he was a co-founder of the Marxist Workers' School, where he taught with Hermann Duncker, Jürgen Kuczynski, Georg Lukács and Karl August Wittfogel among others.

In the 1928 election, Alexander was elected to the Reichstag, but was not allowed to run in the 1930 election as a member of the so-called Conciliator faction.

In 1931, he was elected mayor of the city of Boizenburg with the support of both the KPD and SPD, but was not able to assume office due to a breakdown of the party alliance.

Following the Nazi rise to power in 1933, Alexander was disbarred on the grounds that he was allegedly half-Jewish. Later the same year, he was appointed as an arbitrator for trade affairs of the German-Russian trading association.

On 22 August 1944, Eduard Ludwig Alexander was arrested as part of the "Aktion Gitter" campaign and transferred to Sachsenhausen concentration camp. He died in transit to Bergen-Belsen concentration camp on 1 March 1945.

Personal life
In 1902, he met Gertrud Gaudin (1882–1967), who at that time was graduating from art studies in Berlin. They married in 1908; under her married name Gertrud Alexander was later known as a communist politician, author, publicist and cultural critic. They divorced in the 1920s and in 1925 she moved to Moscow with both of their children.

In 1929 he married Maria Seyring, a physician, with whom he had three children.

Memorials

In Berlin since 1992, Alexander's name appears on one of the 96 plaques in the Memorial to the Murdered Members of the Reichstag, on the corner of Scheidemannstraße / Republic Square in Berlin near the Reichstag building.

In March 2009, in front of Alexander's former residence at Cimbernstraße 13 in the Steglitz-Zehlendorf – Nikolassee district of Berlin, a Stolperstein was laid in his memory.

Works
Eduard Ludwig: Changes in German Foreign Trade. In: The International - Journal of Practice and Theory of Marxism, Volume 1922. Volume 3. Verlag Neue Kritik, Frankfurt 1971.
Eduard Ludwig: Gold, money and paper. A reply to the money theory Vargas. In: The International - Journal of Practice and Theory of Marxism, Volume 1923. Volume 4. Verlag Neue Kritik, Frankfurt 1971.

Literature
 Erwin Dickhoff: Essener Köpfe – wer war was? Bracht, Essen 1985, .
 H. Mayer: Eduard Alexander – ein bedeutender Wirtschaftstheoretiker der KPD. In: Beiträge zur Geschichte der Arbeiterbewegung. Jg. 27, Nr. 1, 1985, S. 65ff.
 Hermann Weber, Andreas Herbst: Deutsche Kommunisten. Biographisches Handbuch 1918 bis 1945. Dietz, Berlin 2004, S. 58–59. Online
 Uwe Wieben: Eduard Alexander. Biographische Skizze eines nahezu vergessenen Politikers der Weimarer Republik, 159 Seiten, verlag am park Berlin 2008, .

References

External links
 
 

Members of the Reichstag of the Weimar Republic
Communist Party of Germany politicians
Sachsenhausen concentration camp prisoners
1881 births
1945 deaths
Jurists from North Rhine-Westphalia
German people who died in Bergen-Belsen concentration camp
Politicians who died in Nazi concentration camps